Echinomyces is a genus of fungi in the family Diatrypaceae.

References

External links
Index Fungorum

Xylariales